Miss República Dominicana 1995 was held on December 2, 1994. There were 30 candidates, representing provinces and municipalities, who entered. The winner would represent the Dominican Republic at Miss Universe 1995 and Miss International 1995. The first runner up would enter Miss World 1995. The second runner up would enter in Reina Mundial del Banano 1995. The rest of finalist entered different pageants.

Results

Delegates

Miss Dominican Republic
1995 beauty pageants
1995 in the Dominican Republic